The women's singles Squash event was part of the squash programme and took place between December 10 and 14, at the Khalifa International Tennis and Squash Complex.

Schedule
All times are Arabia Standard Time (UTC+03:00)

Results

Final

Top half

Bottom half

References 

Results

Squash at the 2006 Asian Games